John Semple was a seventeenth century minister in Ulster and Scotland. He began to preach after exhorting the people while leading the psalm-singing. His Presbyterian principles brought him into opposition to the policies of the civil authorities. He refused The Black Oath and was pursued by those sent from Dublin to apprehend non swearers. He relocated to Scotland and was named multiple times and threatened with severe punishment throughout his life including shortly before his death in his 75th year.

Entry into ministry
John Semple was sometime precentor in a church in County Down. He is said to have been called to the ministry under the following circumstances. It was then the custom to begin divine service with praise, and this continued until the minister had entered the pulpit. On one occasion when a preacher was late in arriving, Semple "had an impulse" to expound the psalm which had been sung, and did it very well. He was shortly afterwards permitted to go on exhorting in private houses, and had many people to hear him in different parts of the country.

The Black Oath
Deputy Strafford, then ruling in Ireland, sought to please Charles I. Two Scottish viscounts (Ards and Claneboy), in the North — on whose lands many of the Presbyterian ministers and people had dwelt, 
— found themselves and estates in hazard. And to vindicate them that they had no hand in the business of Scotland, there was an oath framed to be imposed on all the Ulster-Scots over 16 years of age in the country as a test of their loyalty. They were required to abhor National Covenant in Scotland, or any such thing, and obey the King's royal commands. This oath, called by the people "the Black Oath," was (it is said) framed by these two noblemen, and recommended by the Lord Deputy to be urged by authority on the country — which was done with all rigour from 21 May 1639. The generality did take it who were not bound with a conscience; others hid themselves or fled, leaving their houses, and goods; and divers were imprisoned and kept in various gaols for a considerable time.

Upon refusing the oath, candidates had their names returned to Dublin, from where 'pursuivants' were sent to apprehend those who were deemed disloyal. Several were apprehended and taken prisoners to Dublin. Others, though sent for, escaped the pursuivants who were most earnest to apprehend them. John Semple is recorded to have been nearly captured by the pursuivants several times, but to have escaped despite numerous close shaves with the law.

Carsphairn ministry
John Semple became minister of Carsphairn in Kirkcudbrightshire in 1646, and joined the Protesters in 1651. M'Crie records that, Oliver Cromwell, "marching into a meeting of the ministers in Edinburgh on one occasion, he made a harangue to them nearly an hour in length, in his usual style of rhapsody, and copiously interlarded with quotations from Scripture. The members looked at each other in bewildered amazement, till at length an old minister, Mr. John Semple of Carsphairn, rose up and said : "Moderator, I hardly know what the gentleman wald be at in this long discourse; but one thing I am sure of, he was perverting the Scripture." For this speech the honest minister was punished by six months' imprisonment."

On 23 August 1660 he was imprisoned in Edinburgh Castle by order of the Committee of Estates, who also sequestrated his stipend, 25 September following. He was included in the list of rebels whom the lieges were prohibited from receiving, 4 December 1666, and in a list of those who were to be prosecuted, 15 August 1667, as well as in the list of those to whom pardon and indemnity were granted, 1 October following. At the request of Alexander, Viscount Kenmure, he was granted indulgence at Carsphairn on 3 September 1672. He was fined on 10 July 1673, for not observing the anniversary of the Restoration. When cited before the Privy Council on 4 August 1677, and threatened with death or banishment, he replied, "He is abune [above] that guides the gully [knife]; my God will not let you either kill me or banish me, but I will go home and die in peace." He returned, preached in the parish, and died soon afterwards, aged 75. He left a considerable sum of money to the poor of Kirkcudbright.

Family
John Semple had a wife who was six years his senior. Neither her name nor any children are listed in Wodrow.

Bibliography
Wodrow's Hist., ii., 348
War Committee of Kirkcudbright 
Scots Presbytrian Eloquence
Walter Scott's Heart of Mid-lothian

References
Citations

Sources

Covenanters
1602 births
1677 deaths
People from Kirkcudbright
Ulster Scots people
Evangelicals from Northern Ireland